Below is an incomplete list of individuals that Amnesty International has considered to be prisoners of conscience, organized by country.

Australia 

 Albert Langer

Azerbaijan

Bahrain

Bangladesh

Belarus

China

Eritrea 

 Aster Fissehatsion
 Dawit Isaak
 Mahmoud Ahmed Sheriffo
 Petros Solomon
 Haile Woldetensae

Ethiopia 

 Eskinder Nega
 Bekele Gerba

Guatemala 

 Bernardo Caal Xol
 Virginia Laparra

Hong Kong 

Alex Chow
Nathan Law
Joshua Wong

India 

Binayak Sen
Soni Sori
Irom Sharmila Chanu
Anand Teltumbde
Sayed Ali Shah Geelani 
Maqbool Bhat
Mirwais Umar Farooq

Israel 

Mordechai Vanunu

Iran

Kuwait 

Hamad al-Naqi

Kyrgyzstan 

Azimzhan Askarov

Malaysia 

Ali Abd Jalil
Anwar Ibrahim

Mauritania 

Mohamed Cheikh Ould Mkhaitir

Morocco 

Ali Anouzla

Myanmar 

Phyo Phyo Aung
Hkun Htun Oo

Nigeria 

Fela Kuti

North Korea 

Oh Hae-won

Pakistan 

Junaid Hafeez
Asghar Khan

Philippines 
Leila de Lima

Russia 

Mikhail Kosenko
Nikolay Kavkazsky
Ruslan Sokolovsky
Yaroslav Belousov
Server Mustafayev
Emir-Usein Kuku

Saudi Arabia 

Raif Badawi
Mohammad bin Saleh al-Bajadi
Saud al-Hashimi
Khaled al-Johani
Hamza Kashgari
Ashraf Fayadh
Issa al-Hamid
Alaa Brinji
Ali Mohammed Baqir al-Nimr
Zuhair Kutbi
Mikhlif al-Shammari
Waleed Abu al-Khair
Abdulaziz al-Shubaili
Saleh al-Ashwan
Omar al-Said
Abdulrahman al-Hamid
Abdulkareem al-Khoder
Abdullah al-Hamid
Mohammad Fahad al-Qahtani
Fowzan al-Harbi
Fadhel al-Manasif

Sudan 

Ussamah Mohammed
Faisal Saleh

Syria 

Ali al-Abdullah
Mazen Darwish
Shibal Ibrahim
Riad Seif

Thailand 

Somyot Prueksakasemsuk

Tunisia 

Ramzi Abcha
Ghazi Beji

Turkey 

 Leyla Zana
 Orhan Dogan
 Hatip Dicle
 Selim Sadak

Ukraine 

 Ruslan Kotsaba

United States 

 Martin Sostre (imprisoned 1967-1976)
 Imari Obadele (imprisoned 1973-1978)
 Wilmington Ten (imprisoned 1976-1980)
 Charlotte Three (imprisoned 1977-1979)
 Camilo Mejía (imprisoned 2004-2005)
 Agustin Aguayo (imprisoned 2007)
 Kimberly Rivera (imprisoned 2012-2013)

United Arab Emirates 

Nasser bin Ghaith

Uzbekistan 

Azam Farmonov
Alisher Karamatov
Solijon Abdrahmanov

Venezuela 

Gabriel Rivas Granadillo
Jose Antonio Landaeta Gatica
Leopoldo López
Rosmit Mantilla

Gregory Hinds
Geraldine Chacón

Darvinson Rojas

Vietnam 

Cù Huy Hà Vũ
Le Cong Dinh
Nguyen Dan Que
Nguyen Van Hai
Nguyen Van Ly
Phan Thanh Hai
Ta Phong Tan
Vi Duc Hoi
Trần Huỳnh Duy Thức

References

External links
 Amnesty International resources about prisoners of conscience
 Prisoners of Conscience Appeal Fund

 
Imprisonment and detention